Modoc is an unincorporated community in Phillips County, Arkansas, United States. It is not recognized by the United States Census Bureau.

The town is well known due its prominent place in the song "Caledonia Mission", written by Robbie Robertson and performed by The Band on their 1968 debut album Music from Big Pink.

References

Unincorporated communities in Arkansas
Unincorporated communities in Phillips County, Arkansas
Arkansas placenames of Native American origin